Saul Isaac (1823 – late 1903) was an English businessman and Conservative Party politician.  He was the first Jew to be elected to the House of Commons as a Conservative candidate.

Isaac was a partner in the army contracting business run by his older brother Samuel (1812–1886), which became the largest European supplier of materials to the Confederate States during the American Civil War.

He was elected at the 1874 general election as a Member of Parliament (MP) for Nottingham, when the Conservatives took both the city's parliamentary seats from the Liberals. The election return describes him as a colliery proprietor, of Colwick Hall, Nottinghamshire.

Isaac was defeated at the 1880 general election, and was unsuccessful when he contested Finsbury Central at the 1885 general election.

References

External links 

1823 births
1903 deaths
Conservative Party (UK) MPs for English constituencies
UK MPs 1874–1880
Jewish British politicians
English Jews
People from Colwick
Politicians from Nottingham
19th-century English businesspeople